KIRK (99.9 FM, "The Captain") is a radio station licensed to serve Macon, Missouri, United States.  The station, established in 1998, is currently owned by Alpha Media with the broadcast license held by Alpha Media Licensee LLC.

Programming
KIRK broadcasts a classic hits music format to the greater Moberly, Missouri, area. Local programming includes a two-hours weekday morning show called "KWIXLand This Morning".

Throughout the day the local on-air programmers who can be heard on KIRK include, Brad Boyer, Bill Peterson, Brad Tregnago, Aaron Wood, Eric Messersmith, Brian Hauswirth, Matt Tarnawa, Matt Elliott, Brennan Holtzclaw, Dan Patterson and Curt Derr.

History
This station received its original construction permit from the Federal Communications Commission on February 13, 1998.  The new station was assigned the KIRK call sign by the FCC on March 17, 1998.

In April 1998, permit holder David L. Shepherd filed an application to transfer control of KIRK to a new company called KIRK, LLC, as part of the multi-station Shepherd Group.  The transfer was approved by the FCC on April 30, 1998, and the transaction was consummated on May 6, 1998.  KIRK received its license to cover from the FCC on September 28, 1998.

On February 28, 2007, the Shepherd Group announced they had reached an agreement to sell KIRK to Dean Radio.TV (Dean Goodman, president/CEO) through its GoodRadio.TV, LLC, holding company as part of a 16-station deal valued at a reported $30.6 million.  The deal was approved by the FCC on May 9, 2007, and the transaction was consummated on August 8, 2007.

The Shepherd Group included KJEL-FM and KBNN in Lebanon; KJFF in Festus; KREI and KTJJ in Farmington; KRES and KWIX in Moberly; KIRK in Macon; KOZQ, KOZQ-FM, KJPW, and KFBD-FM in Waynesville; KAAN and KAAN-FM in Bethany; and KMRN and KKWK in Cameron.

As part of an internal reorganization, Dean Radio.TV applied to the FCC in parallel to transfer the license for KIRK from Good Radio.TV, LLC, to the newly formed Moberly/Macon License Company, LLC.  The transfer was approved on May 9, 2007, and the transaction was consummated when the sale from the Shepherd Group was completed on August 8, 2007. At the time of the sale, KIRK broadcast an Adult Top 40 music format branded as "Energy 99".

On August 1, 2013 KIRK shifted their format from oldies to classic hits.

In December 2013, GoodRadio.TV and its subsidiaries merged into Digity, LLC. Effective February 25, 2016, Digity and its 124 radio stations were acquired by Alpha Media for $264 million.

Awards and honors
In March 2008, KIRK/KRES/KWIX program director Brad Boyer was presented a Distinguished Service Award by the Missouri State High School Activities Association.  Boyer received the Distinguished Service Award, established by the MSHSAA in 1988, in recognition of his "statewide leadership in the Missouri Sportswriters and Sportscasters Association" and his "lifelong contributions to the ideals of interscholastic activities".

References

External links
KIRK official website

IRK
Classic hits radio stations in the United States
Macon County, Missouri
Radio stations established in 1998
Alpha Media radio stations